Court Yard Hounds is the debut studio album by American country duo the Court Yard Hounds, founded as a side project of the Dixie Chicks by sisters Emily Robison and Martie Maguire. The album was released on May 4, 2010 via Columbia Records. It was mainly recorded in Maguire's home studio in Austin, and co-produced with Jim Scott (who was also the Grammy-winning sound mixer/engineer on the Dixie Chicks' latest album Taking the Long Way and Playlist: The Best of the Dixie Chicks).

Promotion
On February 10, 2010, the album became available for pre-order. Additionally, four tracks from the album – "Delight (Something New Under the Sun)," "The Coast," "Fear of Wasted Time," and "Ain't No Son" – were available for download to those who pre-ordered the album. The duo made their first public appearance on March 18, 2010 at the Americana Music Association's SXSW showcase, with a tour to follow.

The group's debut single, "The Coast," was released on March 30, 2010 and served as the lead-off single for the album.

The group made their first appearance at SXSW in Austin, TX in 2010. Their first tour was as part of Lilith Fair on July 15, 2010. They are scheduled for around 10 dates on the tour.

Track listing
This Track List was confirmed by their Official Website on February 10, 2010.

Martie Maguire sings lead on her composition, "Gracefully". Lead vocals on all other songs are performed by Emily Robison.

Personnel
Adapted from allmusic

Court Yard Hounds
Martie Maguire: Fiddle, Mandolin, Viola, Lead Vocals, Background Vocals
Emily Robison: Acoustic Guitar, Electric Guitar, Resonator Guitar, Dobro, Banjo, Pump Organ, Lead Vocals, Background Vocals

Additional personnel
Jakob Dylan: Duet Vocals on "See You in the Spring"
Mike Finnigan: Piano
Audley Freed: Acoustic Guitar, Electric Guitar, Twelve-String Guitar, Slide Guitar
Martin Strayer: Acoustic Guitar, Electric Guitar, Piano
Greg Leisz: Steel Guitar
Lloyd Maines: Steel Guitar, Dobro, Mandolin
Jerry Holmes: Autoharp
Glen Fukunaga: Acoustic Bass
George Reiff: Bass guitar
Don Heffington: Drums, Percussion
Pat Manske: Percussion
Tom Hale: French Horn
Brian Standefer: Cello

Production
Adapted from allmusic:
Produced By Emily Robison, Martie Maguire & Jim Scott
Recording Engineers: Les Banks, Pat Manske, Jim Scott & Kevin Szymanski
Additional Recording Engineered By Kevin Dean & Adam Odor
Mixed By Jim Scott
Mastered By Richard Dodd

Chart performance
Court Yard Hounds debuted at #7 on the U.S. Billboard 200, with 61,119 copies sold in its first week. The album has sold approximately 500,000 copies in the United States.

References

2010 debut albums
Columbia Records albums
Court Yard Hounds albums